Essabil (Arabic: السبيل, "The Cause"), also known as the Democratic and Social Itinerary (Itinéraire Démocratique et Social, IDS), is a minor Algerian political party.

History and profile
Eassabil was founded by Abdesslem Ali Rachedi in January 2002.

References

External links
 Essabil

2002 establishments in Algeria
Political parties established in 2002
Political parties in Algeria